Birchfield Platform railway station, Birchfield Halt railway station or Birchfield Siding railway station served the rural area near Glen of Rothes House, Moray, Scotland from 1871 to 1956 on the Morayshire Railway. 1884 is another suggested opening date however it contradicts the map evidence. This was an intermediate station on the Craigellachie-Elgin line of the former Great North of Scotland Railway that had originally been opened by the Morayshire Railway on 1 January 1862.

History 

The station was opened circa 1871 as Birchfield Halt by the Great North of Scotland Railway. The name Birchfield Halt was used from 1939.

Infrastructure
In 1871 the station had a short ill-defined platform and was approached by a long drive that had a junction with the lane that crossed the level crossing. A single siding ran for a short distance south, parallel to the line. A building stood close to the level crossing and a signal was present. By 1903 a shelter was located at the clearly marked platform, but the short siding had been lifted, a signal is no longer indicated and a small building, not marked as a signal box, stands near the site of the level crossing.

The site today
The building first recorded in 1871 is still present in a much modified form and the trackbed is in use as a farmland access.

Notes

References

External links

Disused railway stations in Moray
Former Great North of Scotland Railway stations
Railway stations in Great Britain opened in 1871
Railway stations in Great Britain closed in 1956
1863 establishments in Scotland